The Lichtenhain Waterfall is a waterfall formed by the Lichtenhainer village brook and is situated in the Kirnitzsch Valley in the Saxon Switzerland of Germany.

William Lebrecht Götzinger, chronicler of the Saxon Switzerland, mentioned the waterfall in his 1812 work Schandau and its environments.

The original waterfall was not impressive enough for tourists, so the brook was dammed up by a pushable weir. Since the Kirnitzschtalbahn, a tramway linking the waterfall with Bad Schandau, was opened in 1898, hundreds of thousands of tourists have visited the waterfall.

See also
 Sebnitz
 Mittelndorf
 Bad Schandau Elevator

External links

Landforms of Saxony
Waterfalls of Germany
Sebnitz
Elbe Sandstone Mountains
Bodies of water of Saxon Switzerland